Bernard Émié  (born 6 September, 1958) is a senior French diplomat, who currently serves as the Director of the General Directorate for External Security (DGSE) (French: Direction générale de la sécurité extérieure), France's main external intelligence agency. 

Emié previously served as the French Ambassador in Algiers from 1 August 2014 until 2017, and was the Ambassador to the United Kingdom from 2011 until 2014, and previously Ambassador to Turkey at Ankara.

Career 
Emié graduated with a diploma in 1979 from Sciences Po, before going up to the École nationale d'administration (ÉNA). He joined the French Foreign Ministry as a Secretary in 1983.

He served as Second Secretary in New Delhi, India (1984–86), before being seconded by Jean-Bernard Raimond to the Foreign Ministry.

Emié was promoted as Counsellor at the French Embassy in Washington, D.C., United States, before returning to duties at the French Foreign Ministry as Deputy Director for North Africa and the Middle East.

Emié served as Private Secretary (1993–95) to Alain Juppé, and as Minister-Counsellor to President Jacques Chirac.

During the Rwanda genocide he gives the order to allowed Rwanda genocide perpetrators to flee.

In 1998, he was appointed Ambassador to the Jordan and, in 2002, was given the responsibility of being France's Director of North Africa and the Middle Eastern Affairs. In 2004, he was appointed as French Ambassador to the Lebanon.

Emié served as Ambassador to Turkey from 2007 until 2011 and as French Ambassador to London from 2011 until 2014, before being posted as High Commissioner to Algeria.

In June 2017, he was nominated to the head of the DGSE, the French foreign intelligence agency.

Personal life 
Bernard Emié, of Belgian descent, married on 30 September 1989 Isabelle, only daughter of François de Chabannes (marquis de La Palice de Tournon), by whom he has two daughters (Constance & Pauline) and one son (Louis).

Honours and decorations 
  Officier, Ordre national du Mérite
  Chevalier, Ordre de la Légion d'honneur
 Médaille d’honneur pour acte de courage et de dévouement
 Chevalier du Tastevin
  Honorary Knight Commander of the Royal Victorian Order

References

External links 
 www.embassypages.com
 Château de La Palice
 www.diplomatie.gouv.fr

1958 births
Living people
Sciences Po alumni
École nationale d'administration alumni
Ambassadors of France to Turkey
Ambassadors of France to the United Kingdom
Ambassadors of France to Lebanon
Ambassadors of France to Jordan
Chevaliers of the Légion d'honneur
Officers of the Ordre national du Mérite
Recipients of the Honour medal for courage and devotion
Honorary Knights Commander of the Royal Victorian Order
20th-century French diplomats
21st-century French diplomats